Moulvibazar-3 is a constituency represented in the Jatiya Sangsad (National Parliament) of Bangladesh since 2019 by Nesar Ahmed of the Awami League.

Boundaries 
The constituency encompasses Moulvibazar Sadar and Rajnagar upazilas.

History 
The constituency was created in 1984 from a Sylhet constituency when the former Sylhet District was split into four districts: Sunamganj, Sylhet, Moulvibazar, and Habiganj.

Members of Parliament

Elections

Elections in the 2010s 
Syed Mohsin Ali died in September 2015. Syeda Saira Mohsin, his widow, was elected unopposed in November 2015 after the Election Commission disqualified the other four candidates in the by-election scheduled for December 2015.

Syed Mohsin Ali was elected unopposed in the 2014 general election after opposition parties withdrew their candidacies in a boycott of the election.

Elections in the 2000s 

Saifur Rahman stood for two seats in the October 2001 general election: Sylhet-1 and Moulvibazar-3. After winning both, he chose to represent the former and quit the latter, triggering a by-election. Naser Rahman, his son, was elected on the BNP ticket in a November 2001 by-election.

Elections in the 1990s

References

External links
 

Parliamentary constituencies in Bangladesh
Moulvibazar District